Industry is an unincorporated community in Butler County, Alabama, United States.

Notes

Unincorporated communities in Butler County, Alabama
Unincorporated communities in Alabama